The Cormorant I & II, also referred to as The Cormorant, is the fourth studio album released by American band San Fermin. The album was released in two parts, functioning as a thematic double album. The first half, The Cormorant I, was released in late 2019 and the second half was released in combination with I as The Cormorant I & II in March 2020. These were the first records to be released under the band's new imprint Better Company, in partnership with Sony Music.

This album was the first release with the group's new vocalist Karlie Bruce and saw an expanded singing role for Claire Wellin. Other contributors of note include singers Sarah Pedinotti, Samia, and longtime collaborator Eliza Bagg (Lisel), as well as harpist Lavinia Meijer and Attacca Quartet, among others.

Production 
Like all previous San Fermin releases, the records was written and produced by bandleader Ellis Ludwig-Leone. He wrote the record in the northwestern Icelandic town of Ísafjörður in 2018; Icelandic musician Halldór Smárason, and friend of Ludwig-Leone who played in early San Fermin shows, lives here.

Ludwig-Leone returned to Brooklyn later that year and began working with his San Fermin bandmates, namely Allen Tate, Claire Wellin, John Brandon, Stephen Chen, Michael Hanf, Tyler McDiarmid and Aki Ishiguro, to shape and record the record. During that time, they recruited a new vocalist, New York-based Australian singer-songwriter Karlie Bruce, and recorded with Sarah Pedinotti (of Lip Talk), and Samia Finnerty (of Samia).

Track listing 
All songs written, arranged, and produced by Ellis Ludwig-Leone.

Personnel 
Adapted from liner notes.

Musicians

 Allen Tate – vocals
 Claire Wellin – vocals, background vocals; violin (10)
 Karlie Bruce – vocals
 Sarah Pedinotti – vocals
 Samia – vocals (4)
 Eliza Bagg – background vocals
 Molly Netter – background vocals
 John Brandon – trumpet
 Stephen Chen – baritone sax, soprano sax
 Tyler McDiarmid – guitar
 Aki Ishiguro – guitar
 Ellis Ludwig-Leone – piano, keyboards, additional percussion
 Michael Hanf – drums, vibraphone, glockenspiel, additional percussion
 Isabel Gleicher – flute
 Sam Sadigursky – clarinet
 Alan Ferber – trombone
 Dave Nelson – trombone
 Lavinia Meijer – harp
 Attacca Quartet
 Amy Schroeder – violin
 Keiko Tokunaga – violin
 Nathan Schram – viola
 Andrew Yee – cello

Technical
 Tyler McDiarmid – engineer, additional mix preparation
 Mark Bengston – additional engineering
 Pat Dillet – mixing (2–3, 5, 8–13, 15–16)
 Peter Katis – mixing (1, 4, 6–7, 14)
 Carson Graham – score preparation
 Greg Calbri – mastering
Art and management
 Stephen Halker – album art, art direction, art layout
 Ellis Ludwig-Leone – art direction
 Gaby Alvarez – management, art layout
 Thomas Winkler – management

References 

2019 albums
2020 albums
Sony Music albums